American entertainer Cher has released 26 studio albums, 10 compilation albums, two soundtrack albums, and three live albums. Widely recognized as the Goddess of Pop, Cher has sold over 100 million records worldwide (as a solo artist) and a further 40 million as part of Sonny & Cher, making her one of the best-selling female recording artists in history. Billboard ranked her as the 109th Greatest Artist of all time and the 49th Greatest Hot 100 Artist of all time. According to RIAA, she has sold 12.5 million albums (including three multi-platinum, four platinum and nine gold records) in the United States. Her signature hit "Believe" has sold more than 11 million copies worldwide, and it is the UK's best-selling single by a female artist in history, and one of the best-selling physical singles of all time. 

In 1964 Cher signed a recording contract with Imperial Records, a label owned by Liberty Records. After the success of her first major single, Bob Dylan's "All I Really Want to Do" she and her then-husband Sonny Bono worked on her first album All I Really Want to Do released in 1965. The album peaked at number 16 on the Billboard 200 and at number seven on the UK Albums Chart. After the massive success of "I Got You Babe" the record label encouraged her to record the second album, The Sonny Side of Chér (1966). The record peaked within the top 30 in several countries. Chér (1966) and With Love, Chér (1967) were less successful on the music charts. Backstage and her first official compilation album Cher's Golden Greats (1968) her last efforts with Imperial were critically and commercially unsuccessful. In 1969 Cher signed with Atco Records and released two albums: the critically acclaimed 3614 Jackson Highway and her first soundtrack album Chastity for the film of the same name; both of them were a commercial failure.

Cher entered the 1970s with the release of the album Gypsys, Tramps & Thieves (1971), released under the label Kapp Records later absorbed by the MCA Records. The record proved to be critically and commercially successful peaking at number 16 on the Billboard 200 and was certified gold by the Recording Industry Association of America (RIAA); her first solo album to do so. Next year she followed it with her less successful eighth studio album Foxy Lady. In 1973 she released two records: Bittersweet White Light (which was the last album produced by Sonny Bono) and Half-Breed her second gold album in the United States. Dark Lady was released as her 11th studio album in 1974 and was less successful on the music charts. After the separation with Sonny she signed a new $2.5 million recording contract and business deal with Warner Bros. Records. From 1975 to 1977 she released a string of critic and commercial failures: Stars, I'd Rather Believe in You, Cherished and Two the Hard Way (the latter with her then husband Gregg Allman) which is considered the lowest point of her career. In 1979 she signed with Casablanca Records and released her 15th album: Take Me Home, which was certified gold in the United States. Prisoner (1979) was less successful than its predecessor. In the beginning of the 1980s, Cher formed a band called the "Black Rose" and released their first and only album Black Rose. In 1982 Columbia Records released the album I Paralyze; with decreasing album sales and a lack of successful singles, Cher decided to focus on her acting career.

In 1987 Cher signed with Geffen Records and released her first album in five years: Cher proved to be successful on the music charts and was certified platinum by the RIAA. Her nineteenth studio album Heart of Stone (1989) peaked at number one in Australia and entered the top 10 in several other territories; it achieved multi-platinum status and became her best-selling album at that time. In 1991 Cher released her twentieth studio album Love Hurts; it became her first number-one in the United Kingdom and also topped the album charts of several European countries. However, it was less successful in North America. Her fifth official compilation album and last effort with Geffen, Greatest Hits: 1965–1992 was released outside North America and became her second consecutive number-one album in the United Kingdom and reached the top 10 in many countries around the globe. In 1995 she signed with Warner Bros. which became her main record company. The first release with Warner was her 21st studio album It's a Man's World (1995) which was less successful than its predecessors. Her 22nd studio album Believe released at the end of 1998 was heralded as her comeback album and became her best-selling studio album ever, having sold over 10 million units worldwide. 1999's compilation The Greatest Hits released outside the United States became an international chart-topper. Cher entered the 2000s with the release of the independent album Not Commercial exclusively through her official website. In 2001/02 Cher released her 24th studio album Living Proof which entered the Billboard 200 at number nine and was certified gold. After leaving Warner UK, Cher signed a worldwide deal with the US division of Warner Bros. Records in September 2003. The Very Best of Cher released on the same year was a chart success and was certified two times platinum in the United States. Her third soundtrack album, from the musical film Burlesque was released in 2010 and was certified gold by the RIAA. Cher's studio album, Closer to the Truth, was released in September 2013 and it became her highest-charting solo album when it debuted at number three on the Billboard 200. Cher's latest studio album, Dancing Queen was released on September 28, 2018, and also debuted at number three with first-week sales of 153,000 album-equivalent units, becoming Cher's highest debut sales for an album in the United States, as well as earning her the biggest debut sales for a pop album by a female in the United States in 2018.

Albums

Studio albums

Compilations

Soundtrack albums
{| class="wikitable plainrowheaders" style="text-align:center;"
|-
! scope="col" rowspan="2" style="width:12em;" | Title
! scope="col" rowspan="2" style="width:16em;" | Album details
! scope="col" colspan="10" | Peak chart positions
! scope="col" rowspan="2" style="width:12em;" | Certifications
|-
! scope="col" style="width:3em;font-size:90%;" | US

! scope="col" style="width:3em;font-size:90%;" | AUS

! scope="col" style="width:3em;font-size:90%;" | AUT

! scope="col" style="width:3em;font-size:90%;" | CAN

! scope="col" style="width:3em;font-size:90%;" | DEN

! scope="col" style="width:3em;font-size:90%;" | GER

! scope="col" style="width:3em;font-size:90%;" | NLD

! scope="col" style="width:3em;font-size:90%;" | NZ

! scope="col" style="width:3em;font-size:90%;" | SWI

! scope="col" style="width:3em;font-size:90%;" | UK<ref>Peak chart positions for albums on the UK compilations chart:
For Mermaids: {{cite web|url=http://www.everyhit.com/|title=Official Compilations Chart Top 100: June, 1991|publisher=OCC|volume=Note: To retrieve the chart peak, enter the Mermaids title, select 'albums' as format and click on the search button to see the chart peak|access-date=2013-10-09}}
For Burlesque: 
For Mamma Mia! Here We Go Again!: </ref>
|-
! scope="row" | Chastity|
Released: June 20, 1969
Label: Atco
Formats: LP
| — || — || — || — || — || — || — || — || — || — 
|
|-
! scope="row" | Mermaids|
Released: November 13, 1990
Label: Geffen
Formats: LP, CD
| 65 || 53 || 29 || 35 || — || 55 || — || — || — || 6
|
CAN: Gold
UK: Silver
|-
! scope="row" | Burlesque|
Released: November 19, 2010
Label: RCA
Formats: CD, digital download
| 18 || 2 || 5 || 16 || 38 || 12 || 78 || 5 || 8 || 9
|
US: Gold
AUS: Platinum
CAN: Gold
GER: Gold
UK: Gold
|-
! scope="row" | Mamma Mia!Here We Go Again|
Released: July 13, 2018
Label: Capitol, Polydor
Formats: CD, digital download
| 3 || 1 || 1 || 4 || 5 || 2 || 3 || 1 || 2 || 1
|
DEN: Gold
NZ: Gold
UK: 2× Platinum
|-
| colspan="15" style="text-align:center; font-size:90%;"| "—" denotes items that did not chart or were not released.
|}

Live albums

Video albums

Other albums

Notes
A  Note that the album Gypsys, Tramps & Thieves was originally released under the title Chér. This is the reason why the Gold certification issued by RIAA in 1972 appears under Chér.
B  Note that the Platinum-award received for Cher (1987), is the first Platinum-award for Cher, which is released through Geffen Records, and not through Kapp records as the Platinum for Cher (1987) appears in RIAA's database. This is an anomaly by RIAA which should not confuse readers.
C  Note that some of Australia's earlier certifications cannot be found in ARIA's database as it covers the years 1997–present; therefore, an editor has contacted the ARIA team via e-mail to obtain all available certifications for Cher issued throughout the years.
D  Not Commercial was released exclusively through the Internet via Cher.com and ArtistDirect.
E  Greatest Hits: 1965–1992 was released for the markets outside North America and Canada.
F  If I Could Turn Back Time: Cher's Greatest Hits was released for the American market, and it was only available as an import to certain European countries.
G  The Greatest Hits was released outside the United States.
H  Icon charted on Billboard's Top Album Sales and Catalog Album Sales charts reaching #91 and #18, respectively.
I  Icon has reached #8 on the Official Charts Company's Official Budget Albums Top 50 chart due to it being released at a non-full price in the UK.
J  Mermaids and Burlesque soundtracks' chart positions are from UK's Official Compilations Top 100 chart.
K  Live! The Farewell Tour was released in limited edition form, with only 200,000 copies available.
L  Extravaganza: Live at the Mirage concert was originally released in 1992 and re-released on DVD in 2005 containing bonus songs which were not included on the VHS version.
M  Greatest Hits: The Video Collection was only released in UK and Brazil to promote Cher's compilation Greatest Hits: 1965–1992.
N  Black Rose'' was recorded with the self-titled band. In 1999 it was re-released by a German label "Spectrum" with Cher's name on the cover.

See also
 Cher singles discography
 Cher videography
 Sonny & Cher discography
 List of best-selling albums
 List of best-selling albums by women

References

Works cited

External links
[ Cher Overview] Allmusic

Discography
Discographies of American artists
Pop music discographies